Gregory Torpy (born 28 January 1962) is an Australian sailor. He competed in the Star event at the 1988 Summer Olympics.

References

External links
 

1962 births
Living people
Australian male sailors (sport)
Olympic sailors of Australia
Sailors at the 1988 Summer Olympics – Star
Place of birth missing (living people)
20th-century Australian people